Bicentennial Capitol Mall State Park, commonly known as Bicentennial Mall, is an urban linear landscaped state park in downtown Nashville, Tennessee. Receiving more than 2.5 million visitors annually, it is the most visited of Tennessee's 56 state parks.

The park is modeled on the National Mall in Washington, D.C., and was first conceptualized in 1989 by former Governor Ned McWherter as part of the planning for the state of Tennessee's bicentennial commemoration. Groundbreaking occurred on June 27, 1994, and the park opened to the public on June 1, 1996, the 200th anniversary of Tennessee's statehood.

Description 
The  park is the smallest of Tennessee's state parks. Modeled on the National Mall in Washington, D.C., it features design elements that provide visitors with information on Tennessee's history, natural features, attractions, landmarks, and musical heritage. It incorporates a number of Classical Greek, Baroque, and Beaux-Arts influences. The park has its borders defined by Jefferson Street on the north, James Robertson Parkway on the south, 6th Avenue North on the east, and 7th Avenue North on the west. It is situated directly north of the hill that contains the Tennessee State Capitol, which is distinctly visible from the park. The Nashville Farmers' Market is to the park's immediate west. The Tennessee State Museum is located directly west of the park's north end, and the Tennessee State Library and Archives is east of the north end. A number of state office buildings are also located nearby.

Major features

Both sides of the mall are lined with tulip poplars, Tennessee's state tree, and all trees and shrubs at the park are native to Tennessee. Eight smaller granite maps arranged below it illustrate the state's topography, geology, original inhabitants, musical heritage, and recreational opportunities. 

Directly north of the map is the Rivers of Tennessee Fountains, which feature 31 geyser-like fountains representing the major rivers and waterways of the state. A large trough represents the Mississippi River, which forms the western border of the state. A railroad trestle that carries a CSX mainline crosses the park between the map plaza and river fountains; the park's visitor center, restrooms, and several picnic tables are located underneath this. Near each end of the trestle flies a  Tennessee Flag, each of which is surrounded by eight  state flags. The large flags commemorate the state's bicentennial celebration, and the small flags represent Tennessee's status as the 16th state admitted to the Union.

Directly north of this is the Tennessee Amphitheater, a 2,200-seat terraced amphitheater used for special events. It is patterned off of the Ancient Theatre of Epidaurus. The northern end of the park features the Court of 3 Stars, a circular plaza made of red, white, and blue granite arranged in the tri-star logo found on the Flag of Tennessee. These stars represent the three Grand Divisions of Tennessee. Surrounding the plaza are 50 columns containing a 95-bell carillon, representing the 95 counties of the state and the state's contribution to the development of American popular music. The carillon plays a portion of the Tennessee Waltz each quarter hour, and the entire song each hour. A 96th bell housed on Capitol Hill joins in at the top of each hour, representing the government’s responsiveness to the people.

Walkways

A long tree-lined linear lawn stretches between the amphitheater and the Court of 3 Stars, and features four main walking paths and several memorials. The two inner walkways make up the Path of Volunteers, which alludes to Tennessee's nickname as "The Volunteer State". The south end of the Pathway of Volunteers contains both of the Governor's Time Capsules, which were buried during the park's groundbreaking and opening, respectively. They will be opened on June 27, 2094, and on Tennessee's tricentennial, June 1, 2096, respectively.

The eastern outer path is the Walkway of Counties, which represents the state's geography from east to west. Throughout the walkway are time capsules from each county, arranged from north to south by Grand Division, which will be opened on the state's tricentennial on June 1, 2096. The lids of each capsule contain brief descriptions of their respective county. The planters next to the walkway highlight the state's diverse topographical landforms, and feature flora from across the state's respective regions. Accompanying these are granite obelisks which provide descriptions of the state's nine physiographic regions. An obelisk detailing the history of the Tennessee State Capitol is also located along here.

The western outer path is the Pathway of History, containing a  series of walls, which chronicle major events in the state's history with short inscriptions. This pathway is actually divided into two main sections: a shorter section which provides a brief overview of the state's prehistory and precolonial history, beginning one billion years ago, and a shorter one which provides a more detailed history of the state from 1766 to 1996. A break in the wall symbolizes the division amongst the state's residents during the American Civil War. Each decade, from 1766 to 1996, is represented by a large granite pylon; these are also provided for the precolonial section, which read "One Billion Years Ago", "240 Million Years Ago", "10,000 BC", and "1600 AD", respectively.

Monuments and memorials

A number of monuments and memorials are located adjacent to the Pathway of History. This monument consists of a fountain representing the spring surrounded by a circular wall which contains sixteen stars. These represent Tennessee's status as the sixteenth state admitted to the Union, and information about Tennessee's statehood is also engraved in the wall. The Sulphur Springs Monument consists of three fountains flowing into a rock garden, and symbolizes the wetlands and wildlife of Tennessee. The Centennial Memorial commemorates the Tennessee Centennial and International Exposition of 1897. There is also a monument to Tennesseans who served in the Civilian Conservation Corps.

The World War II Memorial features a plaza that contains ten pillars etched with images and descriptions of the war relevant to the state. The pillars on the east represent events from the European and Mediterranean and Middle Eastern theaters, and the western pillars represent events from the Pacific Theater. The memorial also contains a  granite globe suspended by water, and a bench with the names of the seven recipients of the Medal of Honor from Tennessee. The surface of the plaza contains gold stars honoring the 5,731 Tennesseans who died during the war. A time capsule on the plaza will be opened on November 11, 2045.

History

Site history
Bicentennial Capitol Mall State Park is located near the site of the French Link, a natural salt lick which was fed by the McNairy Spring under the mall. French traders under the command of Charles Charleville established a trading post along the French Lick by the same name in 1714, which was the first European settlement in what is now Nashville. The French Lick and spring attracted settlers from East Tennessee to the region in 1779, who established Fort Nashborough, the namesake of Nashville, along the Cumberland River, and founded the Cumberland Association the following year. The spring continued to be used as one of the city's primary water sources throughout the 19th century, and the area gradually became known as Sulphur Bottoms.

As Nashville grew, a number of residences and businesses occupied the site. Between the 1880s and the 1950s, part of the site that was prone to flooding was used as a dump, with many relics from this period found during construction. A brick sewer tunnel was also constructed under the site of the park in 1892. Beginning in the early 20th century, the area fell into disrepair, and became a red light district. By the 1940s, many of the structures on the site were declared substandard and were subsequently demolished as part of an urban renewal project initiated in 1950.

Park history
In the late 1950s and early 1960s, a building boom resulted in several skyscrapers being constructed around the capitol building. The view to the north, however, remained unobstructed, and a movement arose to preserve this. The state began gradually acquiring much of the land north of the capitol in the early 1970s with the intent of eventually constructing a large office complex, necessitated by the growth in the size of the state government. In 1985, Nashville landscape architect Joe Hodgson suggested redeveloping the land north of the state capitol into a public park, which was echoed by John Bridges of Nashville-based Aladdin Industries in 1988. On July 19, 1989, then-Governor Ned McWherter suggested that the land to the north of the capitol be converted into a linear green space modeled on the National Mall in Washington, D.C., with the intent of opening to the public for the state's bicentennial. On November 7, 1991, the Metropolitan Nashville Council approved a revitalization plan for downtown Nashville, which included the mall.

On June 1, 1992, McWherter signed an executive order creating the Tennessee Bicentennial Commission to oversee the planning of the statewide bicentennial celebration. This 23-member panel, which included a number of prominent business leaders, celebrities, and governmental leaders from around the state, began preliminary planning work for the mall on August 12, 1992. That month, Tuck Hinton Architects and staff from SSOE Engineers and Ross/Fowler Landscape Architects were hired to develop a master plan for the mall. This plan was unveiled to the public on June 2, 1993, and approved by the State Building Commission on July 8, 1993.

The cornerstone for the mall was laid on June 27, 1994, in a ceremony overseen by Governor McWherter. By October of that year, the project had already gone over budget, and engineers began to recommend reductions to the original plan, which resulted in the carillon being deferred in March 1995. On April 27, 1996, the time capsules in the Walkway of the Counties were buried in a ceremony. The park was dedicated on June 1, 1996, by then-Governor Don Sundquist and then-Vice President Al Gore as part of a celebration of Tennessee's 200th anniversary of statehood. The World War II memorial was dedicated on Veterans Day, November 11, 1997. On April 18, 1998, the Civilian Conservation Corps monument was dedicated in a ceremony officiated by David B. Roosevelt, a grandson of President Franklin D. Roosevelt. Construction on the carillon began in January 1999, and operation began on July 14, 2000. The bell on Capitol Hill was dedicated on June 1, 2003. The Tennessee Department of Transportation placed a time capsule on the north end of the park on July 1, 2015, as part of a celebration of the agency's centennial. It will be unearthed on July 1, 2115.

Legacy and events
Since its opening, Bicentennial Capitol Mall State Park has routinely hosted numerous events, including festivals, concerts, and community gatherings, and has come to be the most visited state park in Tennessee. It was ranked by the Nashville Business Journal as the number one tourist attraction in Nashville in 2006. In 2011, the American Planning Association listed the park as one of the top ten public spaces in the United States. Since 2004, the mall has hosted the Tennessee History Festival. This event, which takes place during the second weekend in October, includes reenactors of historical figures and events, and numerous exhibits chronicling the state's history. Since 2016, the park has hosted a New Year's Eve celebration which includes concerts and the ceremonious dropping of a musical note, owing to the city's music industry and nickname of "Music City". In addition, the park routinely offers tours and interpretive events.

Gallery

References

External links 

Bicentennial Mall website at TNStateParks.com

Culture of Nashville, Tennessee
Parks in Nashville, Tennessee
State parks of Tennessee
1996 establishments in Tennessee